Enopa may refer to:
Carposina, a genus of moths
Enopa (Greece), a town of ancient Messenia, Greece